Polon may refer to:

 Połoń, a village in Poland
 Eduard Polón (1861–1930), Finnish business leader and political patriot
 Błażyński Polon, a Polish sailplane

See also